The Weymouth Formation is a geologic formation in Massachusetts. It preserves fossils dating back to the Cambrian period.

See also

 List of fossiliferous stratigraphic units in Massachusetts
 Paleontology in Massachusetts

References
 

Cambrian Massachusetts
Cambrian southern paleotemperate deposits
Cambrian south paleopolar deposits